Peng Hsien-yin and Yang Tsung-hua were the defending champions, but decided not to compete.

Sanchai and Sonchat Ratiwatana won the title, defeating Jamie Delgado and John-Patrick Smith in the final, 6–4, 6–4.

Seeds

Draw

Draw

References
 Main Draw

Busan Open Challenger Tourandnbsp;- Doubles
2014 Doubles